Emma Nilsson (born 18 November 1993) is a Swedish biathlete. She competed in the 2014/15 World Cup season, and also represented Sweden at the Biathlon World Championships 2015 in Kontiolahti.

References

External links 
 

1993 births
Living people
Swedish female biathletes
21st-century Swedish women